Lawton may refer to:

Places
 Lawton, Alberta, Canada
 Lawton, Havana, a neighborhood in Diez de Octubre, Havana City, Cuba
 Lawton Avenue, a major thoroughfare in Fort Bonifacio, Metro Manila, Philippines
 Church Lawton, a small village and civil parish (sometimes known as Lawton) in Cheshire, England
 Plaza Lawton, Manila, Philippines

United States
 Lawton, Indiana
 Lawton, Iowa
 Lawton, Kansas
 Lawton, Michigan
 Lawton, North Dakota
 Lawton, Oklahoma
 Lawton, Pennsylvania
 Lawton, West Virginia, an unincorporated community in Fayette County
 Lawton, Wisconsin
 Lawton's Mill, a historic mill in Exeter, Rhode Island
 Lawton Place Historic District, a historic district on Lawton Place in Waltham, Massachusetts
 Lawton-Almy-Hall Farm, an historic farm in Portsmouth, Rhode Island on the National Register of Historic Places

People
 Lawton (surname)
 Lawton (given name)
 Oscar Lawton Wilkerson (1926-2023), American pilot

See also 

 Lawtons, a Canadian drug store
 Lawtons, New York, USA; a hamlet
 Rural Municipality of Lawtonia No. 135
 Laughton (disambiguation)